HMS Osprey was a three-funnel, 30-knot destroyer ordered by the Royal Navy under the 1896–1897 Naval Estimates from Fairfields.  She was the fifth ship to carry this name since it was introduced in 1797 for an 18-gun ship-sloop.

Construction and career
She was laid down as yard number 397 on 14 November 1896 at the Fairfield shipyard at Govan, Glasgow and launched on 7 April 1897.  During her builder's trials, she made her contracted speed requirement.  She was completed and accepted by the Royal Navy in July 1898. After commissioning she was assigned to the Portsmouth Flotilla of the 1st Fleet.

On 2 February 1900 she was commissioned as tender to HMS Vivid, shore establishment at Devonport, for service in the Devonport Instructional flotilla, and Lieutenant Godfrey Edwin Corbett was appointed in command. In May 1902 she underwent repairs to re-tube her boilers.

Osprey, a member of the Fourth Destroyer Flotilla based at Portsmouth, collided with the destroyer  while leaving Berehaven harbour on 5 July 1911. While Osprey was undamaged, Bonettas bows were damaged. On 30 August 1912 the Admiralty directed all destroyers were to be grouped into classes designated by letters based on contract speed and appearance. As a three-funneled destroyer with a contract speed of 30 knots, Osprey was assigned to the C class. The class letters were painted on the hull below the bridge area and on a funnel.

World War I
For the test mobilization in July 1914 she was assigned to the 8th Destroyer Flotilla based at Chatham.  Here she provided local anti-submarine and counter-mining patrols.  In August 1914 she had been redeployed to the Scapa Flow Local Flotilla to provide anti-submarine patrols for the fleet anchorage until the defences of Scapa Flow could be improved.

She was deployed to the North Channel patrol and based at Larne, Ireland in November 1916.  Her deployment included anti-submarine and counter-mining patrols as well as contraband enforcement. She was attached to the 2nd Destroyer Flotilla  when it was transferred to Londonderry in 1918, and remained based at Larne.

In 1919 Osprey was paid off and laid-up in reserve awaiting disposal.  She was sold on 4 November 1919 to J.H. Lee of Dover for breaking.

She was awarded the battle honour "Belgian Coast 1914 – 17" for her service.

Pennant numbers

Notes

Bibliography

 

Ships built in Govan
1897 ships
C-class destroyers (1913)
World War I destroyers of the United Kingdom
Gipsy-class destroyers